The blotched snake (Elaphe sauromates), a member of the Colubrinae subfamily of the family Colubridae, is a nonvenomous snake found in Eastern Europe. It grows up to 260 cm (8' 6") in length but the medium is 120 to 160 cm. It is one of the largest European snakes. The species has been of cultural and historical significance for its role in ancient Greek and Roman mythology and derived symbolism.

For symbolism of the blotched snake, see Serpent (symbolism).

References

 
 
 

Elaphe
Reptiles described in 1814
Reptiles of Europe